Fort Adams is a small, river port community in Wilkinson County, Mississippi, United States, about  south of Natchez. It is notable for having been the U.S. port of entry on the Mississippi River, before the acquisition of New Orleans; it was the site of an early fort by that name.

The town was called Wilkinburg and was incorporated in 1798. Prior to that time, the community was known as Loftus Heights and formerly had been a Jesuit mission called the Rock of Davion, first settled as such circa 1689-1700.

This is also the site where the Choctaw Treaty of Fort Adams was signed in 1801.

History
Around 1700, a French priest named Father Albert Davion established a mission on the Mississippi River bluffs at or near the site of Fort Adams. The mission, which was established to bring Christianity to local Indians, became a landmark and stopping place for people traveling on the river or on the overland trails that connected Natchez with New Orleans. Davion left the mission by 1720, but the site continued to be called Roche Davion (Davion's Rock) for many years thereafter. It acquired the name Loftus Heights in 1764, when a British expeditionary force led by Major Arthur Loftus was ended after being attacked by Indians at this site.

The site became Fort Adams after the United States and Spain settled a boundary dispute over parts of what is now southern Mississippi. The Treaty of San Lorenzo (Pinckney's Treaty), signed in 1795, established latitude 31 N as the boundary between Spanish West Florida and Mississippi Territory. U.S. General James Wilkinson selected Loftus Heights for a military post in 1798 on the advice of Captain Isaac Guion. The site, on a bluff overlooking the Mississippi River about six miles upriver from the new international boundary, was judged to be a good position for observing and thwarting military movements on the river and was described by Wilkinson as the "most southerly tenable position within our limits." The new fort was named for the sitting U.S. President, John Adams.

In December 1801, Fort Adams was the site of the negotiation and signing of a treaty between the Choctaw and the United States government. The Treaty of Fort Adams was the first in a series of treaties that ceded Choctaw land to the U.S. government and eventually led to the expulsion of the Choctaw Nation from lands east of the Mississippi River.

In subsequent years, the river channel shifted away, leaving Fort Adams far from the Mississippi River. As of 1993, Fort Adams was a small community and the site of businesses that provided supplies to hunting and fishing camps in the region.

See also
U.S. annexation of the Republic of West Florida

References

External links
Fort Adams at NorthAmericanForts.com

Unincorporated communities in Mississippi
Unincorporated communities in Wilkinson County, Mississippi
Mississippi populated places on the Mississippi River